Biruchiy contemporary art project is a leading residence of contemporary art in Ukraine. It was founded in 2006 by the Association of Contemporary Art Researchers. The project is held annually in May and September on the Byriuchyi Island, located in the Sea of Azov. Since 2016, offsite residences have been operating in other European countries (Poland, 2016–2017; Montenegro, 2019). Fifteen seasons of Biruchiy contemporary art project were attended by 228 artists and 12 art groups from 19 countries. Since 2014, a part of participants goes to Italy, since 2017 — to the United States.

Project background

Byriuchyi Island

. The Ukrainian initiative of the beginning of the 21st century was founded by the art production manager Gennadiy Kozub and the artist Volodymyr Gulich. In 2006, it was decided to declare Zaporizhia Oblast to be an art territory. Byriuchyi Island (Zolotiy Bereg recreation centre), which is far away from civilization, was chosen to be the project residency. Artists came to Byriuchyi for two weeks in September. Since 2014, two-week gatherings have been held also in May.

Biruchiy 009 holds an outdoor concert performed by the French cellist and composer Dominique de Williencourt. Biruchiy M Sound Lab was launched at Biruchiy 012 (DJ Sokolov, DJ Mishukov, DJ Expert, Maket/Ivanov Down, DJ Derbastler). Within the framework of Biruchiy 013, for the first time not only paintings and art objects but also contemporary sculpture was created. During Biruchiy 014, it was decided to change its format by creating an experimental platform for several curators. Due to the hostilities, it was possible to hold only three out of six scheduled curator projects; they were later combined into one big project.

In 2015, the Open Group carried out an international performative project "1000-km view". Riding a catamaran, the participants covered 1000-km distance of "Open Gallery Ukraine — the Netherlands" from the Stryi River to Byriuchyi Island. The new project of Biruchiy was developed as collaboration between curator Irina Leifer (Amsterdam) and Mariya Lanko and Lyzaveta German's team (Kyiv), Open Art Route Zuidoost (Amsterdam) within Tandem Ukraine program (an initiative of the European Cultural Foundation and German non-governmental organization MitOst).

In 2016, the main residence got modern exposition space. The final exposition of Biruchiy 016 was demonstrated in a new gallery designed like an ancient Greek temple. Its musical component has gained an independent format. An experimental ethno-electronic festival called Biruchiy Fest was held in 16–18 September 2016. Among participating bands and performers, there were SHANA, Sun Groove, Atomic Simao and Dub Wire. The British Council introduced an arts exchange program, called "SWAP: UK/Ukraine artist residence programme", between United Kingdom and Ukraine; the first item of the program was on the residence on Byriuchyi Island. The British artist Jamie Fitzpatrick, chosen by the program, joined the participants.

In September 2017, about 30 participants of the project organized a voluntary environmental initiative. The volunteers comprised artists from Ukraine, Russia, Italy and Germany, art critic, curators and guests of the residency. The volunteers cleaned up trash left by tourists, from a 10-km area of the seashore near the Azov-Syvash National Nature Park (from Stepok village to Byriuchyi Island spit).

The Coloring project, introduced in May 2018, brought together 60 artists. Each participant was given a coloring album with 12 outline views of the residency. Coloring pages project is designed as an interactive semi-finished product, which invites participants to put familiar landscapes in color not spending time on their layout.

RESÒ Lab (Italy)
. In 2013, RESÒ Lab was initiated in collaboration with RESÒ International Network for Artist Residencies and Educational Programs in Piedmont (Italy). It is a long-term participant exchange project between Biruchiy and leading Italian art foundations. In RESÒ Lab residencies, artists for a few weeks get acquainted with the local art stage. The exchange is both bilateral and unilateral.

In 2013, Byriuchyi Island was visited by Sotheby's representatives, who purchased several painters' works. The residency was also visited by Massimo Melotti, an external relations specialist from Castle of Rivoli museum of contemporary art (Turin, Italy). In 2014, due to the war in Eastern Ukraine, RESÒ delayed Italian artists' coming to Byriuchyi Island. Nevertheless, in November 2014, Vitaliy Kokhan, Ivan Svitlychniy and the curator Sergiy Kantsedal invited by RESÒ, visited the residency of Cittadellarte-Fondazione Pistoletto (Biella, Italy).

In autumn 2015, RESÒ sent to Byriuchyi Island a delegation of artists from Italy, headed by Massimo Melotti. Byriuchyi became the filming location for a film by Italian film directors Gianluca and Massimiliano de Serio, who arrived at the Island immediately after participating in Venice International Film Festival. One of the participants of Biruchiy 016 was the Italian film director and artist Giorgio Cugno. He shot here the fourth part of the film "XAU" with the actor Ostap Stupka in the lead role. The previous parts of the film were shot in Colombia, Egypt and the USA.

In the autumn of 2017, the Italian artist Franco Ariaudo arrived in Byriuchyi Island. Elaborating upon the theme of the September residence "Running on water...", he started working on a long-term project titled "Basilisk" — a set of events to study techniques of running on water. Franco Ariaudo proceeded with the Basilisk project already in Italy (Turin and Rome) and published a limited edition book "Basilisk or how to run on water" in three languages (Italian, English and Russian). This is a rare case of a separate book dedicated to a single author's art project.

In October-November 2017, members of Biruchiy project Alina Yakubenko and Oleksiy Say visited the residency Cittadellarte-Fondazione Pistoletto. Biruchiy 018 was held through the help of the Ukrainian Cultural Foundation and the Istituto Italiano di Cultura in Kyiv. The 13th season of the project centers around artistic comprehension of ritual practices of neoshamanism. The event was visited by Cecilia Guida, PhD and Professor of the Accademia di Belle Arti di Bologna (Bologna, Italy).

Irshansk (Ukraine)
. 19 July 2015 is the starting point of an art intervention of Biruchiy contemporary art project, which expanded the geography of its residence. The first art delegation was welcomed by Irshansk (Zhytomyr Oblast), where a two-week project "Irshansk. Recreation" was carried out. The exposition embraced the urban space and natural landscapes. The project is aimed at promoting cultural decentralization of the country — making the culture creating space go out beyond large centers, to medium-sized cities and small towns.

Klementowice (Poland)
. On 27 June 2016, the geography of Biruchiy project extended to Poland. An offsite residence was created in Klementowice (Lublin Voivodeship), on the basis of the M. Ratay Complex of Agribusiness Schools. For 2 weeks, 14 artists creatively worked on the project "From the common root". Its concept is based on the metaphorical meaning of the word "root" — the fundamental principle, basic constituent of the structure — and it is an artistic response to manipulations in reconsidering the history of the two countries. The project was held under the patronage of the Embassy of Ukraine in Poland.

An educational event, called Biruchiy Art School, was held in Klementowice in January 2017 with the participation of students and young artists. The program included a series of lectures and practical work in workshops. The Polish land artist Jarosław Koziara visited the residence to give a lecture.

Flux Factory (USA)
. In 2017, Biruchiy contemporary art project started cooperating with Flux Factory's artist-in-residence program (Long Island City, NYC). It is a platform, created in the 1990s by seven young Brooklyn artists as an alternative to commercial galleries. Within the framework of an exchange program, a couple of artists — Mykyta Kravtsov and his wife, Camille Sagnes Kravtsova, came to New York City. After several months of work, their personal exhibition "Armageddon" was presented in the exhibition space of Flux Factory.

In 2018, according to the exchange program between Flux Factory and Biruchiy project, Anton Lapov came to New York City. The artist realized the 3-hour radio walk "Queens Semantic Ghosts" and audiovisual performance "lap0fvw".

Gornji Morinj (Montenegro)
. On 17 June 2019, an offsite residence started in the mountain town of Gornji Morinj, located in the Bay of Kotor (the Adriatic Sea). The project is a joint initiative of Biruchiy contemporary art project and the Exodus social club. During three weeks, 19 artists and art critics from 5 countries worked on the theme of Exodus leaded by curator Kostyantyn Doroshenko. The concept is understood in its biblical meaning, "Exodus" — the transition through challenges to a decent and harmonius life.
 
The reporting exhibition supported by the Ukrainian Cultural Foundation, was held in the halls of the National Museum of Montenegro in Cetinje. The opening took place with the participation of the Embassy of Ukraine in Montenegro. 7 other artists from Bosnia and Herzegovina, Montenegro and Serbia submitted their works for the exhibition. The event was largely covered by the country's leading broadcasting companies: RTCG, TV Vijesti, Prva Srpska Televizija, TV 777, Radio Television Cetinje.

Sharhorod (Ukraine)
. On 19–31 May 2021, the Hava Nagila project was implemented in the historic town of Sharhorod, in Vinnytsia Oblast. The event was attended by 17 artists. Different cultures, languages and traditions intersect in the town, creating a whimsical architectural weaving, which formed the basis of the concept. The video mapping was accompanied by a DJ set by the Kyiv musician Oleg Sokolov. The project took place on the territory of Sharhorod art city.

Prymorsk (Ukraine)
, curator Kostyantyn Doroshenko.  On 4 September 2021, a project titled Time Not Lost started in Prymorsk, Zaporizhia Oblast (the historical name of the city is Nogaysk). For two weeks, 20 artists from Ukraine, Belarus and Spain worked on the territory of the Rayduga tourist complex. The project was devoted to understanding how time is lost and whether it is lost at all, and how a time loop works. A multimedia exhibition of the participants' works, dedicated to the 200th anniversary of the city, was held on 17 September 2021, on the eve of the symposium closure.

Name
The word Biruchiy is a neologism, a modified version of the name of the Byriuchyi spit. The neologism was created in the 2000s by the founders of the project as a reflection of contemporary artists' creative approach to the word formation process.

The newly created brand "Biruchiy" is subject to copyright.

The project themes and curators

The main residence

Project commissioner Gennadiy Kozub (since 2006). Project coordinator Olena Speranska (since 2016).

Offsite residences

Participants

 Inara Bagirova, Yulia Belyaeva, Olga Berezyuk, Kateryna Berlova, Nazar Bilyk, Andriy Bludov, Andriy Boyko, Kateryna Buchatska, Volodymyr Budnikov, Anastasiya Budnikova, Mykhaylo Buksha, Mykhaylo Deyak, Olga Gaydash, Lyzaveta German, Kseniya Gnylytska, Zakentiy Gorobyov, Anna Gidora, Oleksandr Glyadelov, Illya Isupov, Dobrynya Ivanov, Zhanna Kadyrova, Nataliya Karpinska, Sergiy Klepach, Alina Kleytman, Dariya Koltsova, Vitaliy Kravets, Yuri Kruchak, Valeriy Kumanovsky, Mariya Lanko, Iryna Lastovkina, Kateryna Libkind, Andriy Lobov, Anton Logov, Maksym Mamsykov, Oleksa Mann, Anna Myronova, Alyona Naumenko, Mariya Pasichnyk, Viktoriya Perevoznikova, Yuri Pikul, Viktor Pokydanets, Sonya Pomogaybo, Mariya Proshkovska, Kyrylo Protsenko, Karyna Pustovalova, Vlada Ralko, Svitlana Ratoshnyuk, Oleksandr Roytburd, Denys Ruban, Ivan Sautkin, Oleksiy Say, Elmira Shemsedynova, Vladyslav Shereshevsky, Andriy Siguntsov, Stanislav Sylantyev, Gnat Solomko, Yuri Solomko, Anna Sorokova, Vasil Tatarsky, Valeriya Trubina, Anna Valieva, Marta Vashchuk, Myroslav Vayda, Matviy Vaysberg, Petro Vladimirov, Mariya Vtorushyna, Glib Vysheslavsky, Alina Yakubenko, Yuri Yefanov, Andriy Zelinsky, Oleksandr Zhyvotkov, Oleksiy Zinchenko, Ujif_notfound /Georgiy Potopalsky/, GAZ group /Vasil Grublyak, Oleksiy Zolotaryov/ (Kyiv).
 Mykyta Shylimov, Volodymyr Yakovets (Cherkasy).
 Mykyta Shalenniy (Dnipropetrovsk).
 Anatoliy Tatarenko (Donetsk).
 Irina Antonyuk, Vasyl Antonyuk, Sergiy Bratkov, Vitaliy Kokhan, Tetyana Malynovska, Roman Mykhaylov, Roman Minin, Olena Polyashchenko, Andriy Rachinsky, Daniil Revkovsky, Oksana Solop, Larysa Stadnyk, Andriy Stogniy, Ivan Svitlychniy, Anton Tkachenko, Artem Volokitin, Oleksiy Yalovega, Oleg Drozdov's architectural workshop /Oleg Drozdov, Bogdan Volynsky, Sergiy Kostyaniy, Vitaliy Pravyk/, Sviter group /Lera Polyanskova, Maksym Robotov/ (Kharkiv).
 Nataliya Blok, Vyacheslav Mashnytsky, Totem group /Stas Volyazlovsky/ (Kherson).
 Yevgen Koroletov (Luhansk).
 Yuri Biley, Pavlo Kovach, Yuri Koval, Viktor Lavniy, Oleksandr Matvienko, Stanislav Turina, Anton Varga, Sergiy Yakunin (Lviv).
 Inna Bobrova, Yakiv Bulavytsky, Andriy Chepurko, Oleksiy Markitan, Rustam Mirzoev, Yulia Mirzoeva, Dmytro Moldavanov, Taras Zaviruykha (Mykolaiv).
 Oleksiy Chepygin, Dmytro Dulfan, Igor Gusev, Stepan Ryabchenko, Nata Trandafir, Albina Yaloza, Apl315 (Odesa).
 Oleksandr Shirokov (Sevastopol).
 Anna Bekerska (Simferopol).
 Sergiy Dubovets, Vadim Kharabaruk, Mykhaylo Khodanych, Ivan Nebesnyk, Marsel Onysko, Robert Saller, Nataliya Shevchenko, Andriy Stegura, Nataliya Tartay, Ruslan Tremba (Uzhgorod).
 Anna Bykova, Andriy Orlov, Anastasia Skorikova (Yalta).
 Marta Berezhnenko, Volodymyr Borodin, Yevgen Kompaneychenko, Olga Kyrychenko, Vsevolod Medvedev, Gennadiy Nikitin, Dmytro Tsipunov, Zheton group /Yevgen Fomenko, Anton Lisikov/ (Zaporizhia).
 Art zebs group /Volodymyr Gulich, Nastya Loyko, VJ Yarkus/ (Yalta, Zaporizhia).
 Critical Archiving Laboratory /Anton Lapov, Larion Lozoviy/ (Kyiv, Luhansk).
 Natsprom group /Oleg Tistol, Mykola Matsenko/ (Kyiv, Cherkasy).
 Syny Morya group (Sons of the Sea group) /Illya Isupov, Oleksandr Matvienko, Marsel Onysko, Andriy Stegura/ (Kyiv, Lviv, Uzhgorod).

 /  — Open Group (Vidkryta grupa) /Arthur van Beek, Yuri Biley, Jesper Buursinkk, Lyzaveta German, Sergiy Klepach, Pavlo Kovach, Valeriy Kumanovsky, Mariya Lanko, Irina Leifer, Stanislav Turina, Anton Varga/ (Kyiv, Lviv, Amsterdam).

 — Jason Fidler (Brisbane).

 — Anna Ermolaeva, Scott Evans, Rita Novak (Vienna).

 — Sergey Kiryushchenko, Aleksey Kuzmich, Aleksey Lunyov (Minsk).

 — Jusuf Hadžifejzović (Sarajevo).

 — Nataliya Filonenko (Vancouver).

 — Alice Nikitinová, Magdaléna Nováková, Jan Zdvořák (Prague); Pavla Nikitina, Jiří Pec (Brno).

 — Sandy Brishler, Mykyta Kravtsov, Camille Sagnes (Paris).

 — Mitya Churikov, Igor Zaidel (Berlin).

 — Vladimir Brodetsky (Tel Aviv).

 — Cecilia Guida, Micol Roubini (Milan), Franco Ariaudo, Giorgio Cugno, Valerio Manghi, Nataliya Polunina, Alessandro Sciaraffa, Gianluca de Serio, Massimiliano de Serio (Turin).

 — Bulat Gelman (Almaty).

 — Vlatka Vujošević (Podgorica), Matviy Krylov (Herceg Novi).

 — Arthur van Beek, Jesper Buursinkk, Irina Leifer (Amsterdam).

 — Karolina Mełnicka, Stachu Szumski (Warsaw).

 — Vladimir Arkhipov, Victoria Begalskaya, Dmitry Bulnygin, Yulia Gnirenko, Rada Ivanova, Boris Kashapov, Arkady Nasonov, Maximilian Roganov, Yuri Shabelnikov, PG artistic group and artistic groups of the Rodchenko Moscow School of Photography and Multimedia /Dariya Baribina, Anna Brandush, Yegor Fedorichev, Dmitry Fedorov, Svetlana Isayeva, Zinaida Isupova, Vadim Kolosov, Nataliya Kononova, Aleksandr Merekin, Ekaterina Muromtseva, Polina Muzyko, Dmitriy Starusev, Denis Tikhomirov, Oleg Ustinov, Andrew Zhandarov/ (Moscow); Tatiana Polyashchenko (Novorossiysk); Nataliya Yudina (Tomsk).

 — Xavier Escala, Nina Murashkina (Barcelona, Catalonia).

 — Ronald Ross.

 — Jamie Fitzpatrick, Pavlo Kerestey (London).

Promotion

Art events
Expositions of Biruchiy works were held in Ukraine: in Zaporizhia (since 2006), Kyiv (since 2011), Koktebel (2013), Kharkiv (2014), Lviv (2018), Melitopol (2018, 2021), Khmelnytskyi (2019). Art events also take place in other countries: Montreal (Canada, 2013), Cetinje (Montenegro, 2019). The project was presented at the contemporary art fair Artissima (Turin, Italy, 2017).

Presentations of publications are held. Biruchiy project includes lectures and master classes by contemporary art stars, presentations of young artists' works, concerts and DJ sets.

Publishing activities
The catalogs of the project are regularly published (9 catalogues by 2018).

Biruchiy contemporary art magazine (certificate of incorporation KB 2104510845P dated 7 November 2014) was issued in 2014–2015. Published on a quarterly basis, 5 issues published. Its editor-in-chief is Gennadiy Kozub. It is a full-color periodical of 68–104 pages, published in Russian and Ukrainian, having a run of 5000 copies, covering contemporary art. The magazine published interviews and comments of renowned art critics, collectors and artists, reviews of exhibitions and projects.

3 CDs were released in 2012–2015. The CD, arranged by DJ Mishukov, included 11 music tracks from Biruchiy 012 (Biruchiy M Sound Lab). The first and the third releases of Cocktail Spirit by Oleg Sokolov and Sergiy Kodatsky also came out.

Gallery

Notes

Publications of the project

Catalogues
 Бирючий 006. [Запорожье, 2007]. [48] с. 
 2 Международный симпозиум современного искусства «Бирючий 007» или «Хиппи Е». 7.09 – 16.09 2007 г.. [Запорожье, 2008]. [52] с. 
 Третий Международный симпозиум современного искусства «Бирючий 008». «Хто ти Е», 4.09 – 13.09 2008. [Запорожье, 2008]. [48] с. 
 Biruchiy 009. Contemporary art. [Запорожье, 2009]. [52] с. 
 Biruchiy 012. Contemporary art project. As a part of Art Kyiv Contemporary 2012. Kyiv, November 1–18, 2012. [Kyiv] : Art Publishing Studio, 2012. 188 p. 
 Biruchiy contemporary art project 013. The habitable zone. [Kyiv : Art Print Studio, 2013]. 224 p. 
 Biruchiy contemporary art project 014 / comp. of the catalogue S. Kantsedal, N. Matsenko, G. Kozub. [Kyiv : Huss, 2015]. 254 p. 
 Biruchiy contemporary art project 015 / cataloger N. Matsenko. [Kyiv : Huss, 2016]. 342 p. 
 Biruchiy contemporary art project 018. Neoshamanism. Ritual power / cataloger O. Speranska. [Kyiv : Huss, 2018]. 173 p.

Magazine
 Biruchiy contemporary art project. 2014 / ed.-in-chief G. Kozub. Kyiv : Best Solutions Ltd, 2014. No. 0. 68 p. 
 Biruchiy contemporary art magazine / ed.-in-chief G. Kozub. Kyiv : Best Solutions Ltd, 2014. No. 1. 104 p. 
 Biruchiy contemporary art magazine / ed.-in-chief G. Kozub. Kyiv : Best Solutions Ltd, 2015. No. 1 (3). 76 p.

Discography
 Biruchiy M Sound Lab 2012 / comp. and mix by DJ Mishukoff. 80 Min / 700 Mb. [Kyiv] : Biruchiy contemporary art project, [2012]. 1 CD; 12 cm. 
 Sokolov & Kodatsky. Cocktail spirit. 80 Min / 700 Mb. [Kyiv] : Biruchiy contemporary art project, [2013]. [Vol. 1] : Xenta absenta. 1 CD; 12 cm.
 DJ Oleg Sokolov & DJ Kodatsky. Cocktail spirit / comp. & mixed March 2015 ; for promotion only ; fragment of pict. by Y. Pikul. 80 Min / 700 Mb. [Kyiv] : Biruchiy contemporary art project, [2015]. Vol. 3. 1 CD; 12 cm.

Literature

Book editions
 Ariaudo, F. Basilisk or how to run on water. [Turin, Italy] : Viaindustriae publishing; Colli publishing platform, [2018]. 144 p. .

Periodicals
 Boczkar, O. W Polsce ukraińscy artyści poszukiwali wspólnych korzeni // Słowo Polskie. Nr 8 (49). Sierpień 2016. S. 18. 
 Matsenko, N. "Od wspólnego korzenia" // Dziennik Kijowski. Nr 14 (525). Sierpień 2016. S. 7. 
 Przegląd prasy polskiej na Ukrainie: "Od wspólnego korzenia" / opracował Krzysztof Szymański // Kurier Galicyjski. Nr 16 (260). 30 sierpnia — 15 września 2016. S. 10. 
 UNIDEE Notebooks 2017. No. 13 : Residency programme for international artists. UNIDEE — University of Ideas. 2014–2017. P. 1, 4–9, 48, 70–77.

External links

 Biruchiy 014 — freedom and art space. BBC Ukrainian. 29 September 2014. 
 Montenegro has become the site of a new international art project. CdM (Podgorica, Montenegro). 13 August 2019. 
 "Exodus" is in Cetinje. SEEcult (Belgrade, Serbia). 17 August 2019. 

Ukrainian contemporary art
Contemporary art exhibitions
Art festivals in Ukraine
2006 in art
2006 establishments in Ukraine
International artist groups and collectives 
European artist groups and collectives